The yellow oriole (Icterus nigrogularis) is a passerine bird in the family Icteridae. It should not be confused with the green oriole, sometimes alternatively called the Australasian yellow oriole (Oriolus flavocinctus), which is an Old World oriole.

Distribution and habitat
The yellow oriole is also called the plantain and small corn bird, and in Venezuela it is known as gonzalito. It breeds in northern South America in Colombia, Venezuela, Trinidad, the Guianas, and parts of northern Brazil, (northern Roraima state, and eastern Amapá). The yellow oriole is a bird of open woodland, scrub, and gardens.

Breeding
Its nest is a 40 cm-long hanging basket, suspended from the end of a branch. The normal clutch is three pale green or grey eggs.

Description
This bird is  20–21 cm long, and weighs 38 g, with mainly yellow plumage, as its name suggests. The adult male has a black eye mask, thin black throat line, black tail, and black wings, with a white wing bar and some white feather edging.

The female is similar, but slightly duller, and the juvenile bird has an olive-tinged yellow back, and lacks black on the face.

Taxonomy
Of the four subspecies of yellow oriole, three are restricted to islands. They differ from the widespread nominate race of the mainland in body and bill size, and minor plumage details.

Diet
The species eats mainly large insects, but also consumes nectar and some fruit (such as berries, cherries, mangoes and bananas).

Call
The song of the yellow oriole is a pleasant, melodious fluting, with some buzzing. The calls include a cat-like whine and chattering noises.

References 

 New World Blackbirds by Jaramillo and Burke, 
 Birds of Venezuela by Hilty,

External links
Stamps (for Netherlands Antilles, Trinidad and Tobago) with RangeMap
"Yellow Oriole" photo gallery VIREO Photo-High Res

yellow oriole
Birds of Colombia
Birds of Venezuela
Birds of the Netherlands Antilles
Birds of the Caribbean
Birds of Trinidad and Tobago
Birds of the Guianas
yellow oriole
yellow oriole